This is a list of Royal Navy military equipment of the Cold War. It is the combat equipment used on Royal Navy ships of this era, including naval artillery, anti-aircraft weapons, radar and other things.

Naval guns 
 BL 15-inch Mk I naval gun
 QF 6-inch Mark N5 gun
 QF 5.25-inch naval gun
 QF 4.5-inch Mk I – V naval gun
 4.5-inch Mark 8 naval gun

Torpedoes 

 Tigerfish

Anti-surface weapons 

 Sea Skua

CIWS 

 Goalkeeper CIWS
Phalanx CIWS

Anti-aircraft weapons 
 Seaslug
 Seacat
 Sea Dart
 Sea Wolf

Anti-submarine weapons 

 Limbo
 Ikara

References

Cold War military equipment
Royal Navy military equipment
United Kingdom
Royal Navy